Zhejiang University of Science and Technology (ZUST) is a public university located in Hangzhou, Zhejiang province, China.

History 
The university was founded in 1980.

Administration

Schools and Departments 
The university is organized into the following schools and departments.

References

External links
 Zhejiang University of Science and Technology Official website

Universities and colleges in Zhejiang
Educational institutions established in 1980
1980 establishments in China